Charlie Petch is a Canadian writer and performer from Toronto, Ontario, whose poetry collection Why I Was Late was the winner of the ReLit Award for poetry in 2022.

Principally a spoken word poet, Petch was the founder of Hot Damn It's a Queer Slam, and was Spoken Word Canada's poet of honour in 2017. They have also written and performed a number of theatrical plays, most notably Mel Malarkey Gets the Bum's Rush.

References

21st-century Canadian poets
21st-century Canadian dramatists and playwrights
Canadian LGBT poets
Canadian non-binary writers
Writers from Toronto
Living people
Year of birth missing (living people)
21st-century Canadian LGBT people